"Powder" is a song by Swiss singer-songwriter Luca Hänni. It was written by Hänni, Tobias Granbacka and Erik Wigelius and produced by Wigelius. The song was released as a digital single on 13 October 2017 by Muve Recordings. It peaked at number 29 on the Swiss Singles Chart.

Music video
A music video to accompany the release of "Powder" was first released onto YouTube on 13 October 2017 at a total length of four minutes and nine seconds.

Track listing

Charts

Release history

References

2017 singles
2017 songs
Luca Hänni songs
Songs written by Luca Hänni